The  New York Giants season was the franchise's 39th season in the National Football League. The Giants won their third consecutive NFL Eastern Conference title with an 11–3 record, their sixth in eight years, but again lost the NFL championship game. This loss was to the Chicago Bears, 14–10 at Wrigley Field, in the Giants' final post-season appearance until 1981.  

Hall of fame quarterback Y. A. Tittle produced one of the greatest passing seasons in NFL history. Tittle had had a breakout season the previous year, but according to Cold Hard Football Facts, "[h]e was even better in 1963, breaking his own record set the year before with 36 TD passes while also leading the league in completion percentage, yards per attempt and passer rating. Tittle's G-Men scored a league-leading 32.0 [points-per-game] and competed in a title game with the Bears, who had the league's best defense in 1963 (10.3 [points-per-game])."

Offseason
A familiar figure on the offensive line, four-time Pro Bowl selection Wietecha, retired after a decade of service, and Greg Larson took over his job at center. Other new faces included third-string quarterback Glynn Griffing (who would spend just a single season in the NFL), linebacker Jerry Hillebrand, and offensive tackles Lane Howell and Lou Kirouac. Hugh McElhenny put on a Giants uniform for the first time in 1963 after 11 years as a star fullback with the San Francisco 49ers and Minnesota Vikings. McElhenny stayed with the Giants for one season, and of the 12 new players on the Giants' roster in 1963, only Hillebrand and John Lo Vetere spent more than two seasons with the team.

The Giants were facing competition as the New York Titans, the laughingstock of the American Football League, were bought in March by a group headed by Sonny Werblin, who changed the team name to the New York Jets. Though still in the archaic Polo Grounds in 1963, they moved into the new Shea Stadium in 1964 and gained quarterback Joe Namath in January 1965.

NFL draft

Roster

Regular season

For Y. A. Tittle, 1963 was his finest season. The New York offense was flooded with capable receivers. Del Shofner, Frank Gifford, Alex Webster, Joe Morrison, Joe Walton, and Thomas were joined by the newly acquired McElhenny, who had already caught many a pass from Tittle when both played for the San Francisco 49ers. Complementing the offense was Don Chandler, whose accurate place-kicking enabled him to become the league's leading scorer in 1963.

Although Tittle threw three touchdown passes for a 37–28 victory in the season opener against the Baltimore Colts, his ribs were injured in the third quarter, and he was forced to spend the rest of the game, and the entire next game as well, on the sideline. Reserve quarterbacks Gugliemi and Griffing were of little help in game 2 at Pitt Stadium, a 31–0 shutout by the Pittsburgh Steelers. Tittle recovered in time for the third game of the season.

In victories over the Philadelphia Eagles and Washington Redskins, Tittle threw a total of five touchdown passes. On defense, Dick Lynch intercepted three Sonny Jurgensen passes in the defeat of the Eagles.

Since their move to Yankee Stadium in 1956, the Giants' home openers were perennially delayed by the stadium's prime tenant, the New York Yankees. The home opener in 1963 was the fifth game of the season, against the Cleveland Browns. Fullback Jim Brown and the undefeated Browns kept their perfect record intact and increased its Eastern Conference lead over the Giants to two games with a 35–24 victory. 

During the next five games, Tittle shifted the Giants' offense into overdrive, averaging 39.6 points per game. Among the victories was a 33–6 defeat of the Browns in the face of 84,000 stunned Cleveland spectators. Before a frustrated Jim Brown was ejected late in the fourth quarter for fighting with a New York defender, he had been held to 40 yards rushing.

In the final nine games in the regular season, the Giants lost only once, a 24–17 to the St. Louis Cardinals at Yankee Stadium, two days after the assassination of President Kennedy. (Commissioner Pete Rozelle received broad criticism from many quarters allowing the regular schedule to proceed on that Sunday, for it had been set aside as a national day of mourning. The AFL postponed its four games.) New York closed out the season with big wins over the Dallas Cowboys, Redskins, and Steelers, and the Giants captured their third consecutive Eastern Conference crown on the final Sunday of the season to finish 11–3, a game ahead of the Browns.

Throughout the autumn of 1963, the air above Giants football games virtually hummed with forward passes. The team amassed 3,558 total passing yards, 47 shy of the Baltimore Colts, who were led by Johnny Unitas. Tittle led the NFL with 36 touchdown tosses, breaking his one-year old single-season record of 33. But New York's passing game was to be severely tested by the league's acknowledged defensive leader: the Chicago Bears.

Schedule

Game summaries

Week 1: Baltimore Colts

Week 2: Pittsburgh Steelers

Week 3: Philadelphia Eagles

    
    
    
    
    
    
    
    

Joe Morrison 12 Rush, 120 Yds

Week 4: Washington Redskins

Week 5: Cleveland Browns

Week 6: Dallas Cowboys

Week 7: Cleveland Browns

Week 8: St. Louis Cardinals

Week 9: Philadelphia Eagles

Week 10: San Francisco 49ers

Week 11: St. Louis Cardinals

Week 12: Dallas Cowboys

Week 13: Washington Redskins

Week 14: Pittsburgh Steelers

Standings

Postseason

Awards and honors
Y. A. Tittle, NFL MVP
Y. A. Tittle, Franchise Record, Most Touchdown Passes in One Season, 36 Touchdown Passes

References

External links
 New York Giants on Pro Football Reference
 Giants on jt-sw.com

New York Giants seasons
New York Giants
New York Giants season
1960s in the Bronx